Archibald Scott may refer to:

 Archibald Scott (moderator) (1837–1909), Scottish minister
 Archie Scott (Archibald Teasdale Scott, 1905–1990), Scottish professional football player

See also
 Archie Scott (cricketer) (Andrew Archibald Steele Scott, 1918–2019), Scottish cricketer